Lights Out is an upcoming American action thriller film Directed by Christian Sesma and Starring Frank Grillo, Mekhi Phifer, Dermot Mulroney, Jaime King and with Scott Adkins.

Cast  
 Frank Grillo as Michael "Duffy" Duffield
 Mekhi Phifer as Max Bomer
 Dermot Mulroney as Sage Parker 
 Jaime King as Detective Ellen Ridgway 
 Scott Adkins as Don "The Reaper" Richter
 Donald Cerrone as Carter 
 Amaury Nolasco as Fosco 
 JuJu Chan as Lynx 
 Erica Peeples as Rachel Bomer

Production 

In January 2022, it was announced that Grillo, Phifer, Adkins and Mulroney were cast in the film. In February that same year, it was announced that Furstenfeld, Nolasco and Cerrone were added to the cast. Later that same month, it was reported that King, Chan and Peeples joined the cast and that the film was officially in production.

References

External links
 

Upcoming films